Gauriram Gupta was an Indian Independence activist and politician and member of First Legislative Assembly of Uttar Pradesh. He was three-time Member of Legislative Assembly from 1952–1957, and 1967–1969, represented Pharenda (Assembly constituency). He died at the age of 78. MLA Pyari Devi Agrahari was his wife.

See also 

 First Legislative Assembly of Uttar Pradesh

References

Indian independence activists
Uttar Pradesh politicians
Indian National Congress politicians
Year of birth missing
Year of death missing
Indian National Congress politicians from Uttar Pradesh